Timothy Johnson (born March 13, 1985) is an American mixed martial artist currently competing in the Heavyweight division of Bellator MMA. A professional competitor since 2010, he has also competed for the UFC. As of November 22, 2022, he is #6 in the Bellator Heavyweight Rankings.

Mixed martial arts career
After completing his collegiate career as a two-time All-American wrestler at Division II Minnesota State University Moorhead, Johnson made his professional mixed martial arts debut in October 2010. He competed primarily for regional organizations around his adopted home of North Dakota. He amassed a record of 7–1, finishing all of his opponents, before signing with the UFC on the heels of a first round finish of Travis Wiuff in October 2014.

Ultimate Fighting Championship
Johnson made his promotional debut against Shamil Abdurakhimov on April 4, 2015, at UFC Fight Night 63. He won the fight via TKO in the final seconds of the first round.

Johnson next faced Jared Rosholt on August 8, 2015, at UFC Fight Night 73. Despite staggering and nearly finishing Rosholt with strikes in the last minute of the fight, Johnson lost the fight via unanimous decision.

Johnson faced promotional newcomer Marcin Tybura on April 10, 2016, at UFC Fight Night 86. He won the fight via unanimous decision.

Johnson next faced Alexander Volkov on November 19, 2016, at UFC Fight Night 99. Volkov was awarded a controversial split decision victory. 12 out of 12 media scores gave the bout to Johnson.

Johnson faced Daniel Omielańczuk on March 18, 2017, at UFC Fight Night 107. He won the back and forth fight by split decision (28–29, 30–27, and 29–28).

Johnson faced promotional newcomer Júnior Albini on July 22, 2017, at UFC on Fox 25. He lost the fight via TKO in the first round.

Johnson faced Marcelo Golm on February 3, 2018, at UFC Fight Night 125. He won the fight via unanimous decision. The fight marked the last bout of his prevailing contract, and the UFC opted not to renew it.

Bellator MMA
On April 13, 2018, it was revealed that Johnson had signed a multi-fight contract with Bellator MMA.

Johnson made his debut against Cheick Kongo on October 13, 2018, at Bellator 208. He lost the fight via knockout in the first round.

Johnson was scheduled to face Azunna Anyanwu in the prelims of Bellator 225 on August 24, 2019. However on the day of the fight, it was announced that Johnson would fill in for Javy Ayala and face former Bellator Heavyweight champion Vitaly Minakov in the co main event. He lost the fight via knockout in the first round.

Johnson next faced Tyrell Fortune at Bellator 239 on February 21, 2020. He won the fight by knockout in the first round.

Johnson next faced Matt Mitrione on August 7, 2020 at Bellator 243. He won the fight via technical knockout in the first round.

On October 10, 2020, Johnson rematched Cheick Kongo at Bellator 248 in Paris, France. He would avenge his previous loss to Kongo with a split-decision victory.

With heavyweight champion Ryan Bader moving on in the Bellator Light Heavyweight World Grand Prix Tournament, Johnson faced Valentin Moldavsky for the Bellator Interim Heavyweight World Championship at Bellator 261 on June 25, 2021. He lost the bout by unanimous decision.

Johnson faced Fedor Emelianenko on October 23, 2021 at Bellator 269. He lost the bout via knockout in the first round.

Johnson was scheduled to rematch Tyrell Fortune on April 15, 2022 at Bellator 277. However, in March 1, 2022, it was announced by Bellator that Johnson was expected to face Linton Vassell and Fortune was set to meet Steve Mowry in the event. Despite rocking Vassell early in the round, Johnson lost the bout via TKO at the end of the first.

Johnson is scheduled to face Said Sowma on April 21, 2023 at Bellator 294.

Championships and accomplishments
Ultimate Fighting Championship
 Performance of the Night (One time)
Dakota Fighting Championships
Dakota FC Heavyweight Championship (One time)
MMAJunkie.com
2020 February Knockout of the Month vs. Tyrell Fortune

Mixed martial arts record

|-
|Loss
|align=center|15–9
|Linton Vassell
|TKO (punches)
|Bellator 277
|
|align=center|1
|align=center|4:21
|San Jose, California, United States
|
|-
|Loss
|align=center|15–8
|Fedor Emelianenko
|KO (punches)
|Bellator 269
|
|align=center|1
|align=center|1:46
|Moscow, Russia
|
|-
|Loss
|align=center|15–7
|Valentin Moldavsky
|Decision (unanimous)
|Bellator 261 
|
|align=center|5
|align=center|5:00
|Uncasville, Connecticut, United States 
|
|-
|Win
|align=center|15–6
|Cheick Kongo
|Decision (split)
|Bellator 248
|
|align=center|3
|align=center|5:00
|Paris, France
|
|-
|Win
|align=center|14–6
|Matt Mitrione
|TKO (punches)
|Bellator 243
|
|align=center|1
|align=center|3:14
|Uncasville, Connecticut, United States
|
|-
|Win
|align=center|13–6
|Tyrell Fortune
|KO (punch)
|Bellator 239
|
|align=center|1
|align=center|2:35
|Thackerville, Oklahoma, United States
|
|-
|Loss
|align=center|12–6
|Vitaly Minakov 
|KO (punches)
|Bellator 225
|
|align=center|1
|align=center|1:45
|Bridgeport, Connecticut, United States
|
|-
|Loss
|align=center|12–5
|Cheick Kongo
|KO (punches)
|Bellator 208
|
|align=center|1
|align=center|1:08
|Uniondale, New York, United States
|
|-
|Win
|align=center|12–4
|Marcelo Golm
|Decision (unanimous)
|UFC Fight Night: Machida vs. Anders
|
|align=center|3
|align=center|5:00
|Belém, Brazil
|
|-
|Loss
|align=center|11–4
|Júnior Albini
|TKO (punches)
|UFC on Fox: Weidman vs. Gastelum
|
|align=center|1
|align=center|2:51
|Uniondale, New York, United States
|
|-
|Win
|align=center|11–3
|Daniel Omielańczuk
|Decision (split)
|UFC Fight Night: Manuwa vs. Anderson
|
|align=center|3
|align=center|5:00
|London, England
|
|-
|Loss
|align=center|10–3
|Alexander Volkov
|Decision (split)
|UFC Fight Night: Mousasi vs. Hall 2
|
|align=center|3
|align=center|5:00
|Belfast, Northern Ireland
|
|-
|Win
|align=center|10–2
|Marcin Tybura
|Decision (unanimous)
|UFC Fight Night: Rothwell vs. dos Santos
|
|align=center|3
|align=center|5:00
|Zagreb, Croatia
|
|-
|Loss
|align=center|9–2
|Jared Rosholt
|Decision (unanimous)
|UFC Fight Night: Teixeira vs. Saint Preux
|
|align=center|3
|align=center|5:00
|Nashville, Tennessee, United States
|
|-
|Win
|align=center| 9–1
|Shamil Abdurakhimov
|TKO (punches)
|UFC Fight Night: Mendes vs. Lamas
|
|align=center|1
|align=center|4:57
|Fairfax, Virginia, United States
|
|-
|Win
|align=center| 8–1
|Travis Wiuff
|TKO (punches)
|Dakota FC 19
|
|align=center|1
|align=center|3:36
|Fargo, North Dakota, United States
|
|-
| Win
|align=center| 7–1
|Kevin Asplund
|Submission (front choke)
|Beatdown at 4 Bears 11
|
|align=center|1
|align=center|2:41
|New Town, North Dakota, United States
|
|-
| Win
|align=center| 6–1
|Brett Murphy
|TKO (slam and punches)
| Dakota FC 18
|
|align=center| 2
|align=center| 1:17
|Fargo, North Dakota, United States
|
|-
| Win
|align=center| 5–1
|Brian Heden
| TKO (punches)
|Dakota FC 17
|
|align=center|2
|align=center|2:56
|Fargo, North Dakota, United States
|
|-
| Win
|align=center| 4–1
|Scott Hough
| Submission (arm-triangle choke)
|Max Fights 18
|
|align=center|1
|align=center|4:56
|Fargo, North Dakota, United States
|
|-
|Win
|align=center| 3–1
|Dean Lamb
|Submission (punches)
|Max Fights 17
|
|align=center|1
|align=center|0:34
|Fargo, North Dakota, United States
|
|-
|Win
|align=center| 2–1
|Shane DeZee
|Submission (americana)
|Max Fights 16
|
|align=center|1
|align=center|0:49
|Fargo, North Dakota, United States
|
|-
| Loss
|align=center| 1–1
|Lance Peterson
| Submission (kimura)
|Max Fights 13
|
|align=center|2
|align=center|2:52
|Fargo, North Dakota, United States
|
|-
| Win
|align=center| 1–0
|Travis Wiley
| Submission (rear-naked choke)
|Max Fights 11
|
|align=center|1
|align=center|2:23
|Fargo, North Dakota, United States
|
|-

See also

 List of current Bellator fighters
 List of male mixed martial artists

References

External links
 Timothy Johnson at Bellator (archived)
 

1985 births
Living people
American male mixed martial artists
Heavyweight mixed martial artists
Mixed martial artists utilizing collegiate wrestling
Mixed martial artists from Minnesota
Ultimate Fighting Championship male fighters
Bellator male fighters
American male sport wrestlers
Amateur wrestlers
People from Lamberton, Minnesota
Sportspeople from Fargo, North Dakota